Javiel Montes De Oca Genova (born ) is a Cuban male volleyball player. He is part of the Cuba men's national volleyball team. On club level he plays for MAYABEQUE.

References

External links
 profile at FIVB.org

1997 births
Living people
Cuban men's volleyball players
Place of birth missing (living people)